Iván Otero Yugueros (born 16 April 1977 in Oviedo, Asturias) is a Spanish former footballer who played as a central defender.

External links

1977 births
Living people
Footballers from Oviedo
Spanish footballers
Association football defenders
La Liga players
Segunda División players
Segunda División B players
Tercera División players
Divisiones Regionales de Fútbol players
Sporting de Gijón B players
Sporting de Gijón players
Getafe CF footballers
CD Ourense footballers
Zamora CF footballers
SD Ejea players
Logroñés CF footballers
Cultural Leonesa footballers
UP Langreo footballers
Real Avilés CF footballers